Tongxin Jishu Shiyan (TJS) is a Chinese military satellite program operating in geostationary orbit (GEO). TJS satellites are manufactured by the China Academy of Space Technology (CAST) and launched from Xichang Satellite Launch Center (XSLC) in China's southern Sichuan Province. TJS is likely the cover name for multiple geostationary military satellite programs and should not be confused with the similarly named Shiyan satellite program.

Unlike traditional, non-military satellites where the Chinese government announces the satellite's name, mission, platform, launch vehicle, and launch site in advance, with TJS satellites the Chinese government announces airspace closures the day before and makes vague statements on the satellite's purpose after the launch.

Although the true purpose of TJS satellites remains classified, satellite observers speculate these satellites provide early warning and signals intelligence (SIGINT) for the Chinese People's Liberation Army (PLA).

Classes 
Satellites under the Tongxin Jishu Shiyan cover appear to compose three separate classes, all in geostationary orbit and performing a military or intelligence mission. These include the purported Qianshao-3 SIGINT class, the Huoyan-1 early warning class, and an unknown class for TJS-3 and its subsatellite.

Qianshao-3 
TJS-1, TJS-4, and TJS-9 satellites, launched in 2015, 2019, and 2021, maintain geostationary orbit over the Indian Ocean and Micronesia and are suspected to comprise the Qianshao-3 SIGINT satellite class. The Chinese government originally stated these satellites were designed to test Ka-band broadband communication (27–40 GHz) but has not commented on the satellites since they achieved geostationary orbit. In January 2017, novel reports of an antenna approximately 32 meters wide reinforced speculation of the satellite's potential SIGINT mission. Other Chinese sources suggest the Qianshao series are space-based infrared early warning satellites.

Huoyan-1 
TJS-2, TJS-5, and TJS-6 satellites are, according to official Chinese statements "new generation high capacity experimental communications and broadcasting satellites" testing "high speed and multi-frequency wide-band data transfer." Launched in 2017, 2020, and 2021, these satellites are rumored to be of the Huoyan-1 program — China's first early-warning satellites in geosynchronous orbit. These purported Huoyan-1 series satellites remain fixed in orbit over the Indian Ocean, South China Sea, and Oceania.

TJS-3 satellites 
The third satellite of the Tongxin Jishu Shiyan program, TJS-3, is still largely shrouded in secrecy with observers unable to determine if the satellite performs an early warning or signals intelligence mission. Said to have only had one payload aboard during its 2018 launch, observers detected a secondary object separate from TJS-3 in orbit. The object was originally labeled by the United States Space Force as an apogee kick motor (AKM), a final-impulse motor often discarded by satellites entering their terminal geostationary orbit. The secondary object drew public intrigue when, on January 4 and January 11, 2019 (weeks after launch), the secondary object performed station-keeping maneuvers to maintain a synchronized orbit with the main TJS-3 satellite, uncharacteristic of a discarded AKM. Reinforcing suspicions, on Friday, 18 January 2019, the subsatellite maneuvered eastward over Southeast Asia with the main TJS-3 satellite performing the same maneuver two days later. The two satellites continued to complete a number of synchronized maneuvers.

Later in May 2019, capitalizing on the passing of the day-night terminator which makes satellite tracking by optical telescope impractical, the TJS-3 maneuvered far out of its orbit with its subsatellite taking its place shortly after. According to Jim Cooper, lead for space situational awareness for the space-tracking company COMSPOC, TJS-3 and its subsatellite were likely developing and validating tactics, techniques, and procedures (TTPs) for spoofing other nation's space situational awareness efforts which would mistake the subsatellite for its parent while the latter could "be off doing things that are potentially threatening". China has yet to acknowledge any secondary object associated with the TJS-3.

Satellites

See also 

 Yaogan
 Shijian
 EKS (satellite system)

References 

Satellites of China
Satellite series
Reconnaissance satellites
Signals intelligence satellites